Alex Salaueu (September 13, 1926 – May 23, 2021) was a Belarusian Avant-garde artist. Salaueu was a Member of the Union of Artists of the Republic of Belarus and an Honored Artist of the Byelorussian SSR (1982).

Biography 
In 1943–1944, at the age of 17, he participated in the partisan movement, from 1944 he was in the army and took part in the battles in the Baltic States and on the Karelian Isthmus. Subsequently, Alex Salaueu was awarded the Order of the Red Star, as well as commemorative medals in honor of the Victory in the Great Patriotic War. 

Alex Salaueu was in 1945 - 1949 in Tallinn, he met many times Ado Vabbe who initiated him in Art and recommended he pursue painting abstract.
After demobilization in 1949, the artist went to his mother in Madona, Latvia. In 1955 he entered Saint Petersburg Art and Industry Academy to the department of masters of monumental-decorative painting. 
After graduation he worked for some time as a teacher of drawing in high school in Madona. 
He graduated from Leningrad Higher Art and Industrial College named after V. Mukhina (1957), Belarusian Theatre and Art Institute (1965). 
From 1965, he worked as a production designer at the Y. Kolas National Academic Drama Theater, and later (until 1995) - as his main artist. Since 1966, Alex Salaueu became a member of the Union of Artists of the USSR.

In 1968-1969 he was the chairman of the artistic council of the Vitebsk art production workshops.

He became a member of Belarusian Union of Artists (1966). 

He worked in theatre-decorative art, easel painting and graphics.
He has designed more than 100 performances, including «Symon the Musician» by Yakub Kolas (1976), «Kastus Kalinouski» by V. Karatkevich (1978), «Threshold» by A. Dudarev (1982), «Romeo and Juliet» by William Shakespeare (1986), «Mudromer» by N. Matukovsky (1988), «Love and Intrigue» by A. Petrushevskaya (1989) and others.

 In 1973-1977 - Chairman of the Board of the Vitebsk regional organization of the Union of Artists of the BSSR. 
 In 1982, Alex Salaueu was awarded the title of Honored Artist of the Byelorussian SSR.
 In 2017, Alex Salaueu was awarded the Order of Francis Skaryna in accordance with the presidential decree for many years of fruitful work, significant personal contribution to the development of art and culture of Belarus.

Art development 
The arrival of Alex Salaueu to Vitebsk marked the appearance of the post-war urban avant-garde. As an artist who grew up on the classical school and world models of realism, Salaueu studied all sorts of abstract and realistic systems, and also began to combine realism with abstract art. During his work, the artist designed more than eight hundred performances in Vitebsk and more than a hundred in various theaters in Belarus and abroad.

Alex Salaueu was an active participant in city, regional, republican and international exhibitions. Also his works were exhibited in Russia, the Baltic States, Germany, France and Australia. In 2010, the artist donated 35 of his works to the Vitebsk Art Museum, including abstract compositions and design sketches of decorations for the performances of the National Academic Drama Theater named after Yakub Kolas and pictorial canvases.  Created for various theaters (including the Yakub Kolas National Academic Drama Theater), they allow one to get acquainted with the events of the post-war years through the prism of the author's perception, to trace the theatrical tendencies of that time. In addition, the artist gave the city paintings "Crucifixion", "Eve", "Requiem", "Old Fresco" and others. The work of Alexander Solovyov became an integral part of the culture not only of Vitebsk, where the artist had a significant influence on the formation of the artistic environment of the city, but also the whole of Belarus in the second half of the 20th century. Work in the artist's studio did not stop until his death. Alex Salaueu and Tony Zhuravel and are prominent representatives of the Vitebsk Art school founded by Marc Chagall and Kazimir Malevich .

Theater 
How stupendous, how overwhelming was the Vitebsk master's work in the theatre.
For the best part of a century Alex Salaueu showed on many occasions that there was a rich vein of theatre in his blood.
The theatre began to emerge as a mainstream form of art in the second half of the 19th century. The idea of a synthesis of the arts, engendered by the historicism of the 19th century, realised its creative potential, first and foremost, on the stage. As we know, Richard Wagner's operatic performances were the fullest embodiment of the Gesamtkunst-werk.

Alex Salaueu was to become actively involved in the theatre movements of both large and small forms.
The work of the Salaueu was always figurative and anthropomorphic; his pictures have an intriguing subject and his figures fixed, typical features. The ramified associative nature of his painterly mise-en-scenes elevated his work to the level of a mythological reality that was more authentic than the visible and everyday. Salaueu's works were about fundamentals — love, birth, death, the people. As in masterpieces performed on the stage by great actors and actresses, his main instruments were transfiguration and catharsis.

At the same time it must be stressed that Salaueu understood the phenomena of the theatre and "theatricality" in his own idiosyncratic way, attributing to them a kind of artificiality. Later he was quite critical of theatricality as such, and used to compare the theatre unfavourably with the circus.

Alex Salaueu: Fantasies for the Stage

Museums 
 Belarusian National Arts Museum (Minsk, Belarus)
 Marc Chagall Museum (Vitebsk, Belarus)
 Pushkin Museum (Moscow)
 Tretyakov Gallery (Russia)
 New Brunswick Museum (USA)
 Museum of Modern Art (Frankfurt)
 The funds of the Belarusian Union of Artists

Exhibitions 
 1963 – republican exhibition dedicated to the 45th anniversary of the BSSR, Minsk.
 1967 – republican exhibition of the works of scene-designers, art directors and TV designers, Minsk.
 1981 – republican art exhibition « The USSR – is Our Homeland » dedicated to the 60th anniversary of the USSR foundation.
 1987 – republican exhibition of the works of scene-designers, art directors and TV designers, Minsk.
 2009 – republican art exhibition «ABSTRACT-2009» dedicated to the anniversary of Vitebsk Art School, Minsk.
 2010 – republican art exhibition «ABSTRACT-2009» dedicated to the anniversary of Vitebsk Art School, Minsk.
 1967 – regional art exhibition «Vitebsk the Heroic and the Labour», Vitebsk regional museum;
 1967 – regional art exhibition dedicated to the 50th anniversary of October Revolution, Vitebsk.
 1968 – regional art exhibition «Vitebsk the Heroic and the Labour», Vitebsk;
 1968 – anniversary regional art exhibition dedicated to the 50th anniversary of the BSSR and KPB, Vitebsk.
 1974 – regional art exhibition dedicated to the 30th anniversary of liberation of Belarus and Vitebsk from fascist aggressors, Vitebsk.
 1987 – regional art exhibition dedicated to the 70th anniversary of October Revolution, Vitebsk.
 1974 – retrospective exhibition of the works by belorussian artists of 1944–1974, Minsk.
 1976 – anniversary personal exhibition, Vitebsk.
 1980 – exhibition of the artists А. Salaueu, L. Antimonov, А. Orlov, Vitebsk.
 1982 – exhibition of the artists from Vitebsk region, Smolensk.
 1986 – exhibition of the artists А. Salaueu, L. Antimonov, Polotsk;
 1986 – personal art exhibition, Vitebsk regional museum.
 1989 – exhibition of Vitebsk artists dedicated to the 70th anniversary of the BSSR and KPB, Vitebsk;
 1989 – exhibition of scene-designers following the results of the theatre season of 1987–1988, Minsk.
 1993 – exhibition of the artists А. Salaueu and P. Kirilin, Vitebsk.
 1997 – exhibition of the artists А. Salaueu and V. Chukin, Vitebsk.
 2000 – personal art exhibition, Vitebsk.
 2000 – personal animalistic exhibition, Vitebsk (Art Museum).
 2001 – anniversary personal exhibition (Yakub Kolas National Academic Drama Theatre), Vitebsk;
 2001 – anniversary personal exhibition Vitebsk regional museum;
 2001 – anniversary personal exhibition (exhibition hall of the UA), Vitebsk;
 2001 – personal art exhibition, Polotsk.
 2004 – art exhibition «There was a War» dedicated to the 60th anniversary of liberation of Belarus and Vitebsk from fascist aggressors, Vitebsk.
 2005 – personal art exhibition Vitebsk Museum of Modern Art;
 2005 – personal art exhibition (Regional Library name after V. Lenin), Vitebsk.
 2006 – anniversary personal exhibition, Vitebsk Museum of Modern Art.
 2009 – personal art exhibition, Vitebsk Museum of Modern Art
 2010 – personal art exhibition «One-man Theater», Vitebsk.
 2011 – personal art exhibition к 85th anniversary of A. Salaueu's birth (Yakub Kolas National Academic Drama Theatre, Regional Museum of Local History), Vitebsk;
 2011 – personal art exhibition « Revelation», Vitebsk;
 2011 – art exhibition «What does Motherland Start with», Vitebsk;
 2011 – exhibition dedicated to the 40th anniversary Vitebsk organization of artists, Minsk.
 2012 – personal art exhibition «Element of Colour» (Regional Library name after V. Lenin), Vitebsk;
 2012– exhibition of works «Fine Gift, Invaluable Gift», granted to Vitebsk Museum of Modern Art, Vitebsk.
 2013 – personal art exhibition «Theatre of Alexander Salaueu» (Yakub Kolas National Academic Drama Theatre, Regional Museum of Local History), Vitebsk.
 2015 – personal art exhibition «Our Eternal Nature: colour, rhythm, space» (Art Museum), Vitebsk.
 2016 – personal anniversary art exhibition «The Movement of My Dream», dedicated to the 90th anniversary of the artist (exhibition hall of CE «Museum "Vitebsk Centre of Modern Art"»), Vitebsk;
 2016 – personal anniversary art exhibition «Reality With No Similarity» to the 90th anniversary of Honoured Art Worker of Belarus Alexander Salaueu Belarusian National Arts Museum, Minsk.
 2017 – exhibition of the thematic works by Vitebsk artists – veterans of the Great Patriotic War «War In the Works of Its Soldiers» Vitebsk Museum of Modern Art, May, 8 – June, 4), Vitebsk.

Honours, decorations, awards and distinctions 
Order of the Patriotic War
Order of Francysk Skaryna

Oeuvres

Notes

References

Bibliography 

1. Аляксандр Салаўёў // Саюз творцаў [Выяўленчы матэрыял] = A Union of creators : фотаальбом / уклад. і аўт. тэксту М. Цыбульскі ; аўт. уступ. У. Андрэйчанка ; фат. В. Балоціна, М. Цыбульскага. — Мн. : Беларусь, 2005. — С. 115. — На беларус. і англ. мовах.

2. Іваноўскі, Ю. І. Салаўёў Аляксандр Аляксандравіч / Ю. І. Іваноўскі // Беларуская энцыклапедыя : у 18 т. / рэдкал.: Г. П. Пашкоў (гал. рэд.) [і інш.]. — Мн. : БелЭН, 2002. — Т. 14. — С. 103.

3. Салаўёў Аляксандр Аляксандравіч // Беларускі саюз мастакоў : 1938—1998 : энцыкл. даведнік / аўт.-склад. Б. А. Крэпак [і інш.]. — Мн. : ВТАА «Кавалер Паблішэрс», 1998. — С. 482. — На беларус. і англ. мовах.

4. Салаўёў Аляксандр Аляксандравіч // Сучасныя мастакі Віцебшчыны : біябібліягр. слоўнік / ДУ «Віцебская абласная бібліятэка імя У. І. Леніна», Аддзел літаратуры па мастацтве ; склад. В. І. Аліева. — Віцебск, 1994. — С. 94—97.

5. Салаўёў Аляксандр Аляксандравіч // Энцыклапедыя літаратуры і мастацтва Беларусі : у 5 т. / рэдкал.: І. П. Шамякін (гал. рэд.) [і інш.]. — Мн. : Беларус. Сав. Энцыкл.,1987. — Т. 4. — С. 615.

6. Цыбульский, М. Л. Соловьев Александр Александрович / М. Л. Цыбульский // Регионы Беларуси : энцикл. : в 7 т. / редкол.: Т. В. Белова (гл. ред.) [и др.]. — Мн. : Беларус. Энцыкл. імя П. Броўкі, 2011. — Т. 2 : Витебская область. Кн. 2. — С. 481. 

* * * * *

7. Аблажэй, А. Горкае паветра Віцебска / А. Аблажэй // Мастацтва Беларусі. — 1991. — No. 1. — С. 36—45.

8. Анцімонаў, Л. «Версіі» сваёй мадэлі / Л. Анцімонаў // Культура. — 2011. — 7—13 мая. — С. 9.

9. Анцімонаў, Л. Між дзвюх плыняў / Л. Анцімонаў // Літаратура і мастацтва. —2011. — 7 кастр. — С. 23.

10. Анцімонаў, Л. «Работа пачынаецца з сумненняў» / Л. Анцімонаў // Мастацтва Беларусі. — 1986. — No. 11. — С. 14—16.

11. Базан, Л. Паліфонія фарбаў і пачуццяў / Л. Базан // Віцебскі рабочы. — 1986. — 18 снеж.

12. Валодзька, Г. Самы ўнікальны і загадкавы ... / Г. Валодзька //Віцебскі рабочы. — 1992. — 10 сак.

13. Васильев, В. Дума о художнике / В. Васильев // Витебский курьер. — 1998. — 3 апр. — С. 3.

14. Гришина, А. В вихре чувств и цвета / А. Гришина // Віцебскі рабочы. — 2012. — 8 мая. — С. 8.

15. Дягилев, Л. Добро должно всегда побеждать / Л. Дягилев // Советская культура. — 1985. — 5 янв. — С. 5.

16. Змітровіч, Л. Выстаўка віцебскіх мастакоў / Л. Змітровіч // Віцебскі рабочы. — 1980. — 2 лют.

17. Крупица, Н. Выпало жить! / Н. Крупица // Віцьбічы=Витьбичи. — 2012. — 19 мая. — С. 10.

18. Ладзісаў, А. Не паўтараць даўно вядомых ісцін / А. Ладзісаў // Сцяг камунізму (Полацк). — 1986. — 1 жн.

19. Ліхачоў, У. А калі проста: зайсці і паглядзець / У. Ліхачоў // Сцяг камунізму (Полацк). — 1986. — 16 жн. — С. 2.

20. Мазынскі, В. Трое пад адным дахам / В. Мазынскі // Віцебскі рабочы. — 1980. — 27 лют.

21. Навумчык, С. Смелы талент: мастаку А. Салаўёву — 60 год / С. Навумчык // Віцебскі рабочы. — 1986. — 12 верас.

22. Пастернак, Т. Дуэт на вернисаже / Т. Пастернак // Народнае слова. — 1993. — 18 студз. — С. 2.

23. Пастернак, Т. «Откровение» Александра Соловьева / Т. Пастернак // Народнае слова. — 2011. — 17 верас. — С. 6.

24. Пастернак, Т. Портрет лучшего друга / Т. Пастернак // Народнае слова. — 2001. — 1 сак. — С. 8.

25. Пастернак, Т. «Реквием» по XX веку / Т. Пастернак // Народнае слова. — 2009. — 12 мая. — С. 7.

26. Пастернак, Т. У художника есть крылья / Т. Пастернак // Народнае слова. — 1997. — 2 лiп.

27. Рубан, В. Мастак, які дорыць радасць / В. Рубан // Віцебскі рабочы. — 1972. — 4 ліп.

28. Рубан, В. Точку ставит художник / В. Рубан // Знамя юности. — 1972. — 7 янв.

29. Салаўёў, А. І ўспыхне святло рампы / А. Салаўёў // Віцебскі рабочы. — 1983. — 5 лют.

30. Соловьев, А. «В искусстве главное — инстинкт и интуиция» / А. Соловьев // Народнае слова. — 2006. — 21 кастр. — С. 8.

31. Соловьев, А. «Живопись — это странствия души ... » / А. Соловьев ; беседовала Т. Соловьева // Витебский проспект. — 2009. — 14 мая. — С. 3.

32. Соловьев, А. Откровения Сан Саныча / А. Соловьев ; беседовала Н. Крупица // Віцьбічы=Витьбичи. — 2012. — 19 янв. — С. IV.

33. Соловьев, А. «Это моя исповедь, мой путь ... » / А. Соловьев ; беседовала Н. Крупица // Віцьбічы=Витьбичи. — 2009. — 12 мая. — С. 7.

34. Соловьев, А. «Я хочу увидеть себя ... » / А. Соловьев ; беседу вел Л. Тимошик // Знамя юности. — 1992. — 23 апр.

35. Соловьева, Т. «В искусстве нельзя врать» / Т. Соловьева // Витебский проспект. — 2011. — 15 сент. — С. 5.

36. Соловьева, Т. Неоценимый дар / Т. Соловьева // Витебский проспект. — 2010. — 10 июня. — С. 4.

37. Сыс, Е. «Театр одного художника» / Е. Сыс // Віцебскі рабочы. — 2010. — 15 мая. — С. 4.

38. Хабацьеў, Г. У свеце тэатра і кіно / Г. Хабацьеў // Віцебскі рабочы. — 1987. — 18 лістап.

1926 births
2021 deaths
Russian contemporary artists
Belarusian painters
Modern painters
Russian painters
Russian male painters
Russian emigrants to Belarus
Abstract painters
Abstract expressionist artists
Expressionist painters
Belarusian State Academy of Arts alumni
People from Novgorod Oblast
Soviet partisans
Soviet military personnel of World War II